Abraham Washington Attell (February 22, 1883 – February 7, 1970), often referred to by newspapers as "The Little Hebrew", was an American boxer who became known for his record-setting, six year consecutive reign as World Featherweight Champion from 1906 to 1912, and his nearly consecutive ten-year reign starting in 1902. Said to be a friend of the gangster Arnold Rothstein, Attell was charged with game fixing in the Black Sox Scandal in 1919, but the charges were dismissed before trial. He also was suspected of other infractions including fixing fights, and using drugs during a fight.

Life and career
Attell was born in San Francisco, California, the son of Jewish parents. Many sources give his year of birth as 1884, but in an article published in the October 1961 issue of Cavalier magazine, he stated that he had turned 78 that year. A copy of his passport also gives his birth year as 1883, and the 1900 U.S. Census gives his age as 17. Growing up in a mostly Irish neighborhood, he was often involved in fights with neighborhood boys. He said as a kid, he sometimes had up to 10 bouts each day. After his father abandoned the family when Attell was 13, he sold newspapers to earn money. Selling at the corner of 8th and Market, near the Mechanics Pavilion, a frequent venue for important boxing matches, Attell watched the fight between Solly Smith and George Dixon for the world's Featherweight championship. With that, Attell and his brothers Caesar and Monte became convinced they might have futures in boxing.

Attell's first professional fight was at age 17 on August 19, 1900, when he knocked out Kid Lennett in two rounds at the San Francisco Athletic Club.  His mother, who strongly opposed his boxing, later became one of his staunchest supporters, betting on him to win.

World featherweight champion
After winning 10 fights in a row by knockout, Attell moved to Denver, Colorado. At the age of 18, he fought George Dixon and beat him in a 15-round decision after having drawn with him twice before. In 1903, he beat Johnny Reagan in a 20 round decision to claim the previously vacated featherweight title one year after Young Corbett II vacated.

Attell successfully defended his title twenty-two times between 1906 and 1912, which to this day remains a division record. Among other opponents, Attell beat Battling Nelson and Johnny Kilbane during this period. He was often called "The Little Champ" or "The Little Hebrew" by newspapers. From 1909 to 1910, his brother Monte Attell, called the "Nob Hill Terror", held the Bantamweight Championship, making them the first brothers to hold world titles simultaneously. His brother, Caesar Attell also fought and was called "Two and a Half," for always giving that amount whenever the hat was passed for charity at a boxing event, which he attended faithfully. During his time as world featherweight champion, Attell was allegedly involved with gambler/gangster Arnold Rothstein. According to some accounts, they became good friends during this period.

Attell defeated American 1905 World Bantamweight Champion Jimmy Walsh three times in title matches; on September 12, 1907, for a ten-round decision in Indianapolis, on December 7, 1906, in a ten-round TKO in Los Angeles, and on February 22, 1906, for a fifteen-round decision in Chelsea, Massachusetts, in which Attell "badly punished" Walsh. Not surprisingly, Attell was the odds on favorite for the December 1906 fight. He met Attell twice in non-title matches on April 3, 1913, in New York in a ten-round loss by decision and on October 24, 1912, in a twelve-round draw in Boston.  After the April 3, 1913, New York bout, Walsh's manager Eddie Keevin filed charges against Attell with the New York boxing commission stating that Attell had used eye gouging against Walsh during the fight.<ref>"Charges Filed Against Attell", The Salt Lake Tribune", Salt Lake City, Utah, pg. 8, 8 April 1913</ref>

Later career
Attell lost his World Featherweight Title to Johnny Kilbane in 1912, in a 20-round decision. Kilbane claimed that Attell's handlers put chloroform on the fighter's glove to blind him. Other witnesses claimed other illegal tactics were used in the fight.  On July 4, 1913, Attell accidentally hit a referee during a win against Willie Beecher. He finally retired in 1917. Attell managed one boxer, Marty Goldman. He coached him to a 33 Win (10 ko's), 11 Loss, 3 Draw record in 47 career fights.

After his professional boxing career ended, Attell operated a shoe store in New York City, doing a good business selling to customers, fans and sporting people who came in to see him. He gave up the shoe business around June 1916 to go into vaudeville.

His name was later linked to the infamous Black Sox baseball scandal of 1919. He was alleged to have been the bag man for gambler Arnold Rothstein and to have given $10,000 to several Chicago White Sox players. They had in return agreed to throw the World Series with Cincinnati. When the scandal broke in 1920, Attell went to Canada for a year to avoid being subpoenaed. Rothstein was never indicted for the crime.

Black Sox Scandal
In 1920 Attell was accused of being the messenger between the gangster Rothstein and players of the Chicago White Sox baseball organization, during the planning stages of the fix of the 1919 World Series. Prior to the series, Attell had been approached by former fighter Billy Maharg and former Major League Baseball pitcher "Sleepy" Bill Burns in their bid to get Rothstein to financially back the fix. The Black Sox scandal was considered a major outrage in sports and Attell's name appeared in newspaper headlines related to the scandal. He and many White Sox players were formally charged with several counts, including fixing the event, however Rothstein was never charged. All were eventually acquitted at trial, but Major League Baseball banned them from participating in baseball activities at any level. Attell denied having been involved in any talks about fixing the series and convinced the jury that the wrong Abe Attell was accused.

Attell died in New Paltz, New York, on February 7, 1970.

The Great Depression and beyond

Following the 1919 Major League Baseball gambling impropriety, which did much to taint a spectacular featherweight career, Attell lived a full and extraordinary life.

In 2017, McFarland & Company published the first comprehensive biography of Attell, The Fighting Times of Abe Attell, by author Mark Allen Baker.

Legacy and honors
Attell was inducted posthumously as a member of various halls of fame:

 1955, the Ring Boxing Hall of Fame 
 1982, National Jewish Sports Hall of Fame;
 1983, the International Jewish Sports Hall of Fame
 1981, World Boxing Hall of Fame.
 1985, San Francisco Boxing Hall of Fame;
 1990, first class of the International Boxing Hall of Fame
 His record of 92 wins, 10 losses, 18 draws and 45 no-decisions, with 51 wins by knockout, earned him a place on the list of Ring Magazine'': "Fighters with 50 or More Knockout Wins".

Professional boxing record
All information in this section is derived from BoxRec, unless otherwise stated.

Official record

All newspaper decisions are officially regarded as “no decision” bouts and are not counted in the win/loss/draw column.

Unofficial record

Record with the inclusion of newspaper decisions in the win/loss/draw column.

See also
 List of select Jewish boxers
 Black Sox Scandal

References

External links
 
 Abe Attell - CBZ Profile
 Biography at Jewishsports
 

|-

|-

1880s births
1970 deaths
Featherweight boxers
International Boxing Hall of Fame inductees
Jewish boxers
Boxers from San Francisco
World boxing champions
World featherweight boxing champions
Jewish American boxers
International Jewish Sports Hall of Fame inductees
People from New Paltz, New York
American male boxers